The 181st Street Ice Palace in Manhattan, New York was an indoor, artificial ice rink. The venue was used for a variety of ice-related activities but was primarily a figure skating and speed skating rink.

History
Sometime prior to the United States' entry into World War I, a new ice rink opened in Manhattan. Initially it was a big success, however, during the summer of 1917 the price of artificial ice was fixed at $4.40 a ton (approximately $111 in 2022) and the rink was forced to close as an unnecessary luxury. The rink reopened shortly after the end of the war and became the home for Joe Moore, who would go on to compete in the first winter Olympiad in 1924. 

For a few years, the rink also served as a home for the Columbia Lions men's ice hockey. While the rink was not designed with ice hockey in mind, the team used the rink for three seasons before they decided the arrangement was untenable and suspended operations until a better venue could be found.

Mention of the rink ceased after 1925 and the land was later used as both a White Castle restaurant and as a Shell gasoline station. As of 2022, the building at the address was disused.

References

External links

Sports venues completed in 1917
Columbia Lions men's ice hockey
College ice hockey venues in the United States
Indoor ice hockey venues in the United States
Indoor ice hockey venues in New York (state)
Defunct sports venues in Manhattan